Szreniawa  (German: Schenawe, renamed Schönforst in 1937) is a village in the administrative district of Gmina Sława, within Wschowa County, Lubusz Voivodeship, in western Poland.

References

Szreniawa